Cruks en Karnak is an Ecuadorian rock band formed in Quito, Ecuador in 1989.

History
The members of the band were born and raised in a middle-class neighbourhood within Quito. In the beginning they tried to gain awareness and recognition in the music scene by performing at local pubs and bars. After gaining in popularity, their music became known throughout the country through heavy airplay.

The main feature of Los Cruks (as they are known in their country) is to have tried from the early beginnings to rescue the values of Ecuadorian nationalism. Their music mixes rock and a wide range of styles such as pop, Afro-Latin music, funk, Latin American folk music, and many others, achieving the sound for which they are known.

Los Cruks have taken their music across Latin America and the US, sharing the stage with important similar style artists, showing the quality of Ecuadorian music to a lot of different countries.

As the Germany World Cup 2006 took place, they were invited to perform various live shows through the European country where they earned respect from the public because of their original style.

The band broke up in 2007, after launching their final album in 2006, Antrologia.

Formation 
 Sergio Sacoto Arias
 Andrés Sacoto Arias
 Pablo Santacruz
 Pablo Estrella
 Esteban Rivadeneira

Collaborators 
 Ernesto Karolys (drums)
 Gino Castillo (percussion)

Discography
 Tu Culpa (1993)
 Cruks en Karnak (1997)
 La dimensión del cuy (1999)
 Las desventuras de Cruks en Karnak (2003)
 13 Gracias (2004)
 Antrología (2006)

Ecuadorian musical groups